Traders is a business simulation game with a science fiction setting. It was created by André Wüthrich and published by Merit software in 1991. Traders was inspired by M.U.L.E. and was released for DOS, Atari ST and Amiga home computers. Up to four players control characters, aliens known as Plubbers, make the most money in a commercial competition. Players grow fields, sell products, and raid other players.

See also
 M.U.L.E.
 Subtrade
 Planet M.U.L.E.

References 
 https://web.archive.org/web/20081014050814/http://amigareviews.classicgaming.gamespy.com/traders.htm

External links
 
 Screenshots

1991 video games
Amiga games
Atari ST games
DOS games
Business simulation games
Science fiction video games
Video games developed in Germany
Merit Studios games